The Beach-Knapp District encompasses a collection of six 19th-century buildings in the Chinatown neighborhood of Boston, Massachusetts.  It is centered at the corner of Beach and Knapp Streets, and includes three buildings on the south side of Beach Street, and three on the east side of Knapp.  The buildings encapsulate the transition of the area from a predominantly residential area to a mixed residential-light industrial area in the 19th century.  At 5 and 7 Knapp Street stand two Greek Revival residential structures, both built in the 1830s.  The four story Renaissaince Revival building at 7-15 Beach Street was built c. 1885, and was historically used as a hotel. The other three buildings, 17-23 Beach, 25-29 Beach, and 9-23 Knapp, are all commercial buildings dating between 1885 and 1906; two of them were designed by Shepley, Rutan and Coolidge.

The district was listed on the National Register of Historic Places in 1980.

See also
National Register of Historic Places listings in northern Boston, Massachusetts

References

Historic districts in Suffolk County, Massachusetts
National Register of Historic Places in Boston
Historic districts on the National Register of Historic Places in Massachusetts